Rodrigo Galilea Vial (born 19 July 1973) is a Chilean politician who currently serves as a member of the Senate of Chile. Similarly, he served as a member of the Chamber of Deputies of Chile.

References

External links
 BCN Profile

1966 births
Living people
Chilean people of Basque descent
Pontifical Catholic University of Chile alumni
National Renewal (Chile) politicians
Senators of the LV Legislative Period of the National Congress of Chile
Senators of the LVI Legislative Period of the National Congress of Chile